The Mind Benders is a 1963 novel by the British writer James Kennaway.

It is based on the screenplay he had written for the film The Mind Benders directed by Basil Dearden, which was released the same year.

References

Bibliography
 Trevor Royle. Macmillan Companion to Scottish Literature. Macmillan, 1984.

1963 British novels
Novels by James Kennaway
Novels based on films
Signet Books books